"Piece of Your Heart" is a song by Italian production trio Meduza featuring British vocal trio Goodboys, released as a single by Virgin Records on 1 February 2019. It peaked at number two on the UK Singles Chart and topped the US Dance Club Songs chart. As of October 2022, the song has amassed more than 840 million streams on Spotify.

Background
Both Meduza and Goodboys are co-managed by the same management company and had a mutual friend, and began working at the same studio in London in 2018. While recording, Joshua Grimmett from Goodboys spoke through the talk box and said "Sorry, just quickly..." before singing the "da-da-da-da" hook. Both groups have different managers at the company, with one saying the remark should be taken out, while the other said it should be kept in. Matt from Meduza said that he hoped that the song inspired other producers to make house records that will be played on the radio.

Charts

Weekly charts

Monthly charts

Year-end charts

Certifications

References

2019 debut singles
2019 songs
Goodboys songs
Meduza (producers) songs
Number-one singles in Russia
Virgin Records singles